The Biggest Loser Brunei (season 1) is the first season of The Biggest Loser Brunei, which is the Bruneian version of the NBC reality television series The Biggest Loser. This first season was officially premiered on  May 24, 2010 on BNC Network HD.

This first season will feature twelve contestants and they will be divided into two teams of six players. The teams were each led by a personal trainer, Ezuan Aziz with the blue team and Juliana Mikael with the Red team. This first season was hosted by Stacy Sandra. Ahmad Ali Azizul is the winner for this first season.

Contestants

Weigh-ins

Game
 Week's Biggest Loser
 Immunity (Challenge or Weigh-in)
 Immunity & Week's Biggest Loser
 Last person eliminate
Winners
 B$250,000 (among the finalists)
 B$100,000 Winner (among the eliminated contestants)

Total Weight loss history

Voting history

 Immunity
 Below yellow line, unable to vote
 Not in elimination, unable to vote
 Against Brunei's vote
 Vote not revealed
 Valid vote cast
 Below red line, automatically eliminated
 Last person eliminated at finale

External links

Mass media in Brunei
2010 Bruneian television seasons